Bayfront Park is a  park found in the West-end of Hamilton Harbour in the North End neighbourhood of Hamilton, Ontario, Canada.

The park is the site of a variety of summer festivals and concerts.

Other important features of the park include: a public boat launch, fishing opportunities, a 250 space parking lot, and pedestrian and bicycle trails leading to Pier 4 Park.

Nearby attractions include the Harbour West Marina Complex, Macassa Bay Yacht Club, Pier 4 Park, Pier 8, HHC Sailing School and the Royal Hamilton Yacht Club.

Images

References

MapArt Golden Horseshoe Atlas - Page 647 - Grids F11

External links
Bay Area Restoration Council (www.hamiltonharbour.ca)
Hamilton Waterfront Trail (www.waterfronttrail.org)
Hamilton Waterfront Trust (www.hamiltonwaterfront.com)

Parks in Hamilton, Ontario